Itay Noy (born 1972) is an Israeli watchmaker, designer and artist who creates limited-edition timepieces in his independent studio in the Old Jaffa. Noy's timepieces combine craftsmanship with thought-provoking design, meant to induce philosophical perspectives on the concept of time.

Education

1996-2000 B.F.A. Jewelry and Object Design, Bezalel Academy of Art and Design, Jerusalem

1998 Student exchange program, Gerrit Rietveld Academy, Amsterdam, Netherlands

2002 Industrial Design, Interior and Identity Design, Design Academy Eindhoven, Netherlands

M.Des. from the Eindhoven University of Technology

Professional experience
Since 1999 independent artist and designer

Since 2000 Designer of timepieces and Jewelry for international companies

Since 2005 Lecturer at  the Jewelry & Fashion department, Bezalel Academy of Art and Design, Jerusalem 

2007 Summer course at Penland School of Craft, North Carolina, USA

2016 Member at the Judges committee  for The Design Prize, Ministry of Cultural of Israel

Awards
1999 America-Israel Cultural Foundation, Scholarship for the years 1999, 2000
1999 Second prize, competition for design of the statue of the Eurovision contest in Jerusalem
2000 Lockman Prize for practical Design, Bezalel
2000 First prize, Academies category, Biennale Internationale Design, Saint-ֹtienne, France
2001 America-Israel Cultural Foundation, Scholarship for the years 2001, 2002 with distinction
2003 America-Israel Cultural Foundation, Scholarship for Excellency - M.A studies abroad
2005 Outstanding Artist Award, Absorption Ministry
2007 The Andy Prize for the Arts
2011 The Design Prize 2011, Ministry of Cultural of Israel
The Israeli Ministry of Culture and Sport's Prize for Design

Collections
Private collection of Mr. Charles Bronfman, NY
Droog Design collection, Amsterdam, Netherlands
Museum of the Dutch Clock, Zaandam, Netherlands
Private collection of Mr. Stef Wertheimer, Tefen Industrial Park, Israel
The Israel Museum, Jerusalem
Tel Aviv Museum of Art, Tel Aviv, Israel
Design Museum Holon, Israel
Museum for Islamic Art, Jerusalem

Shows 
US: Museum of Art & Design, N.Y | Design week N.Y | SOFA N.Y | Wind Up N.Y I SOFA Chicago | Wind Up San Francisco I YAW Gallery, Michigan | Cotter Gallery, Colorado | China: Gallery bund, Shanghai | Contemporary art terminal, Shenzhen | Netherlands: Modern Kunst Museum, Arnhem | Textile Museum, Tilburg | Droog Design Gallery, Amsterdam | Groningen Museum, Groningen | Israel: Ariela’s Hause, Tel Aviv | Horace Richter Gallery, Old Jaffa | Museum for Israeli Art, Ramat Gan | Art Gallery of Tel Aviv University | Israel: Tikotin Museum, Haifa | Eretz Israel Museum, Tel Aviv | Tal Gallery, Kfar Vradim I Design Museum Holon I Australia: Sydney opera house, Sydney | Melbourne Museum, Melbourne | Biennale Internationale Design 2000, Saint-Etienne, France | pp gallery Taipei, Taiwan | Grand Hornu, Belgium | Basel World, Switzerland

From the press
The Style section of the Wall Street Journal described Noy's Part Time Sun and Moon watch as "an exercise in experimentation. The enigmatic dial features five windows: a central one showing minutes, surrounded by four additional apertures indicating seconds, hours, day (with a sun) and night (with a moon)."  Noy argues that complex design enhances the wearer's engagement with his watch.

External links and articles
W&W
Europa Star
Gear Patrol Magazine

Reviews
A Blog To Watch
Europa Star
Gear Patrol Magazine

References

Israeli watchmakers (people)
Jewellers
Living people
1972 births
Bezalel Academy of Arts and Design alumni